The Epping Ongar Railway is a heritage railway in south-west Essex, England, run by a small number of paid staff and a team of volunteers. It was the final section of the Great Eastern Railway branch line, later the London Underground's Central line from Loughton via Epping to Ongar, with intermediate stations at North Weald and Blake Hall. The line was closed by London Underground in 1994 and sold in 1998. It reopened between 2004 and 2007 as a preserved railway, offering a volunteer-run Class 117 DMU service between Ongar and Coopersale. A change of ownership in 2007 led to the line being closed for restoration to a heritage steam railway, which opened on 25 May 2012.

Early workings 
The line to Ongar was opened in 1865 by the Great Eastern Railway, as an extension to its line from Stratford to Loughton that had been opened in 1856 by its predecessor, the Eastern Counties Railway. The extension was single-track, but whereas the Loughton to Epping section was doubled in the 1890s, the section between Epping and Ongar always remained single, apart from a passing loop at North Weald on opening. The eastern end of the loop was severed in 1888, converting it into a siding. About 14 trains each day went to Ongar; the rest terminated at Loughton or Epping.

This remained the case until 1949, when the London Passenger Transport Board's New Works scheme extended the Central line to Epping using electric trains, taking over the railway from British Railways. The Epping-Ongar branch lost its through trains to London, and there was a shuttle service between Epping (to connect with trains to London) and Ongar; for eight years, there was the unusual sight of steam trains and London Underground electric multiple units side by side at Epping. The steam shuttle was hired by London Transport from British Railways, as it was felt there was no justification for electrification to Ongar unless patronage of the branch rose. Upon taking over the branch in 1949, London Transport re-converted the siding at North Weald into a passing loop and built a second platform to serve a new westbound track.

In the 1950s, there were attempts to improve the service on the branch, and it was electrified in 1957. Due to the low-cost electrification, although the branch could support eight-car trains as far as North Weald, a maximum of four cars could run to Ongar. The voltage drop along the end-fed line was too great to support full-length trains, and the short platforms were not long enough to support eight-car trains. Hence the Epping to Ongar branch was normally operated as an isolated extension of the Central line, with a few through workings south to Loughton. However, for two days every year there were through trains from London to North Weald, for the North Weald airshow, on the Saturday and Sunday of its opening at the aerodrome almost adjacent to the station. The normal Epping to Ongar shuttle dovetailed with this service, passing the terminating trains on the adjacent line during its westbound journey. The through trains were operated as extra trains on the normal weekend Central line timetables, only four cars long due to the restricted platform length at North Weald.

Cutbacks and closure 

From the late 1960s, it became clear that the line's patronage was not growing as had been expected, mainly due to restriction of development in what was now designated Metropolitan Green Belt land. Even at its peak in 1971, the 650 passengers daily hardly made the line an economic proposition. London Underground tried to close the entire line in 1980, but a reduced service was implemented instead, along with the closing of Blake Hall on Sundays.

North Weald's platform one was closed in 1976; then the passing loop/westbound track was lifted in 1978.  Until that time, the station was controlled from the original Eastern Counties Railway signal box, which is still sited on the westbound platform, now fully restored. North Weald was the last section of the London Underground to be signalled with mechanical semaphore signals.

When Blake Hall was closed in 1981, it was said to be handling only six customers a day. The station building survives as a private dwelling.

On 30 September 1994, the line was closed. It was making a loss of £7 for each passenger journey and was in need of some expensive maintenance work. At the time of closure the line was carrying a mere 80 passengers a day. Local lore had it that the line was being kept open in case the Cabinet needed to be evacuated to the Kelvedon Hatch Secret Nuclear Bunker at Doddinghurst. The track was left intact along with the stations, but not maintained.

The last Underground train used on the branch, a three-car unit of 1960 stock, has been preserved by Cravens Heritage Trains. It made a return to the reopened heritage railway in 2014, to mark the 20th anniversary of the line's closure by London Underground.

One unusual feature of the line is its continuing nominal importance to the London Underground. In 1971/72 the London Underground was remeasured in kilometres.  The then most easterly point, Ongar, was chosen as the zero point, and remains so to the present.

Purchase and reopening 

The line was purchased by Pilot Developments (later Epping Ongar Railway Ltd) in 1998. The Ongar Railway Preservation Society entered a £325,000 offer for the line, but Pilot Developments convinced London Underground to accept its slightly higher offer after the bidding deadline. Independent politician Martin Bell described the deal as "the most controversial land deal in the constituency for years", alleging a conflict of interest with local politicians. The line was reopened by the Epping Ongar Railway Volunteer Society on Sunday 10 October 2004, providing an hourly service between Ongar and North Weald. The line was shortly after extended to Coopersale, although there are no boarding or alighting facilities there.

Between 22 January and 9 April 2006 the line was shut down for engineering works. This involved general station maintenance, rolling stock maintenance and track maintenance. Ongar station remained closed for engineering works and general maintenance and reopened on 28 May 2006 without the use of the station buildings.

On Easter weekend 2007, the railway had the most visitors on a single day since reopening, on the Sunday and Monday. The Teddy Bears' Picnic, Anniversary of Reopening and Halloween events are also popular.

At the end of 2007, as a result of the awarding of planning permission for the Ongar residential development, the railway was sold to a new private owner who was committed to bringing steam back to the line.

Following the change of ownership in 2007, it was decided to suspend train operations and to concentrate on improving the track. This was done in order to undertake the major engineering works to secure its long-term future and facilitate the return of steam to the line, including restoration of station buildings, run-round loops, full signalling, and coal and water facilities. There have been major changes to the Ongar and North Weald stations.

Ongar

The goods yard area (derelict since the 1960s) was purchased by David Wilson Homes, which has built a small collection of houses. The Cattle Dock remains, as does the main station building, which has been repainted in GER colours (1900–1930s). Ongar is the only operational GER station in GER colours. Shop and refreshment facilities are available in the main building.

The milk dock is being restored into a bay platform, which will become Platform 2.

All the track has been lowered to accommodate British Rail mainline rolling stock, and a new signal box has been installed at the end of platform 2 in the style of the original and incorporating the original signal frame, which was saved when the original box was demolished. Most of the points and signals are now connected to this.

North Weald

North Weald has been repainted in LNER/BR (E) (1940s–1960s) colours, Brunswick green and cream.

The track height has been lowered to accommodate UK standard stock, and the track has been relaid through the loop and into the bay platform, making three operational platforms; the new signalling allows bi-directional working, gives access to improved siding facilities, and enables safer shunting.

Epping Forest

The rail service has been extended from Coopersale to within a few hundred metres of the London Underground station.  It is impossible to alight at Epping, but the EOR intends to build a platform at the site.

Resumption of passenger services
In March 2012 Epping Ongar Railway announced a resumption of services from 25 May 2012, coinciding with the 150th year since the Great Eastern Railway was formed. On the weekend starting 25 May the railway operated a special service. It now runs train services every weekend and bank holiday in the summer; during the Olympics in July–August 2012 at nearby Stratford, the line operated daily.

EOR runs steam- and diesel-hauled trains between Ongar and North Weald, a diesel shuttle from North Weald to Coopersale Lane, and heritage bus services connecting with surrounding towns and the Central line at Epping.

Heritage railway operations 

During 2004–07 the line ran an hourly service on Sundays and Bank Holidays, on the hour from Ongar, arriving at North Weald at 13 minutes past the hour before departing for Coopersale, and returning to North Weald at 33 minutes past the hour, then leaving for Ongar. The first train left Ongar at 11am, with the last returning at 3:50pm (4:50pm between April and September).

Since reopening in 2012 there have been trains on Saturdays, Sundays, Bank Holidays and some school holiday weekdays. The standard timetable has both a steam hauled train and DMU service in the operation, with trains running from approximately 10 to 16:30.

Current rolling stock
Reference:

Plans of the EOR 

Epping Glade: It is intended to extend trains to a new platform called Epping Glade near the London Underground's Epping tube station. This will require significant investment and discussions on this project are ongoing.
Coopersale Halt: The possibility of building a halt at Coopersale village is under consideration, subject to securing sufficient investment from outside sources and consultation with residents.
North Weald: As part of the infrastructure works the railway is restoring the former goods yard, giving much-needed siding space, and putting back full signalling with both semaphore and colour-light signals. This enables locomotive-hauled trains and gives operational flexibility, enabling increased service frequency. The former Woodford GER latticework footbridge has been completed, replacing the condemned LU concrete structure, which has been demolished and removed.
Ongar: With the track now relaid, works are progressing to restore the station and install signalling. Focus has turned to helping increase flexibility and service frequency, restoring the former cattle and milk platforms, all as part of the works towards running passenger trains to Epping.
Steam: The EOR is likely to be home for the new-build F5 for some time after completion, being a prototypical engine of the former Great Eastern branch. Guest locomotives, both steam and diesel, have appeared (with the reopening of the EOR in May 2012) from time to time.
Class 483: On 24 November 2020, the London Transport Traction Group announced that it had secured a British Rail Class 483 EMU for preservation which it planned to base on the railway with an onboard power supply to facilitate movement on the non-electrified rails. The 483s, an example of converted London Underground 1938 Stock that had been modified to run on the Isle of Wight's Island Line in the late 1980s, is units 483006 and 483008. Both were one of the last 483s in operation, with all of them retired in January 2021 and replaced with new Class 484 units in November 2021.

References

External links 

 
Epping Ongar Railways Official Youtube Channel EORtv1
Epping and Ongar Railway History 
London's Abandoned Tube Stations – Photographs of the Epping-Ongar line between 1977 and 1981
The Tube map in 1990, in which the EOR was still present
Epping station in 1952
Epping station in 1953

 
Heritage railways in Essex
Transport in Epping Forest District